John Henry Johnson may refer to:
John Henry Johnson (1929–2011), NFL running back
John Henry Johnson (baseball), (born 1956)
John Henry Johnson (patent attorney), (1828–1900), British

See also
John Johnson (disambiguation)